Odoornerveen is a village in the Dutch province of Drenthe. It is a part of the municipality of Borger-Odoorn, and lies about 12 km northwest of Emmen.

The village was first mentioned between 1851 and 1855 as "Odoorner veen", and means "peat colony of Odoorn". About  of peat was excavated between 1856 and 1880, and the area was gradually cultivated for agriculture. Odoornerveen never had a church. The former pub was converted into a village house in 1984.

References

Populated places in Drenthe
Borger-Odoorn